The 2021 Oceania Women's Sevens Championship was held in Townsville, Australia on the weekend of 25–27 June 2021. The rugby sevens event was sponsored by the PacificAus Sports program (Australian Department of Foreign Affairs and Trade), and was the tenth Oceania Women's Sevens Championship.

The competition was the final official tournament for Oceania Rugby women's national teams ahead of the Tokyo Olympic Sevens. It was played as a double round-robin format at the North Queensland Stadium, commercially known as Queensland Country Bank Stadium. New Zealand won the tournament undefeated, with Australia as runner-up.

Teams
Four women's teams competed at the 2021 tournament:

 
 
 
 Oceania Barbarians

Tournament
The tournament mirrored the Olympic three-day schedule, with each team playing two matches per day. Each team played the other three teams twice. The highest ranked team after all matches were completed was declared the champion.

Standings

Round 1

Round 2

Round 3

Round 4

Round 5

Round 6

Placings
 
Source:

See also
2021 Oceania Sevens Championship (for men's teams)

References

2021
2021 in women's rugby union
2021 rugby sevens competitions
2021 in Oceanian rugby union
2021 in Australian rugby union
International rugby union competitions hosted by Australia
Sport in Townsville
Oceania Women's Sevens
June 2021 sports events in Australia